Ross E. Cheit is a Professor of Political Science and Professor of International and Public Affairs at Brown University’s Watson Institute for International and Public Affairs.

The Witch Hunt Narrative
Himself a victim of child sexual abuse, Cheit is interested in the issue of repressed memory vis-a-vis childhood sexual abuse in cases like McMartin and the Catholic Church sexual abuse cases and put out his theories in the book The Witch-Hunt Narrative: Politics, Psychology, and the Sexual Abuse of Children.

Cheit argues that some of those accused in alleged day-care sex-abuse hysteria cases, including the Country Walk case, the McMartin preschool trial, and the Oak Hill satanic ritual abuse trial, were actually guilty. (The district attorney declared the Oak Hill defendants "actually innocent", so they were compensated for their imprisonment.)  James M. Wood, Debbie Nathan, Richard Beck, and Keith Hampton criticize that Cheit's work "has omitted or mischaracterized important facts or ignored relevant scientific information" and "is often factually inaccurate and tends to make strong assertions without integrating relevant scholarly and scientific information."  KC Johnson writes "Even as [Cheit's] book gives every benefit of the doubt to the investigators and prosecutors ... much of Cheit’s evidence nonetheless portrays the prosecutions as massive miscarriages of justice."

Biography
Cheit graduated from Williams College (1977, political economy and a coordinate major in environmental studies) before earning a Juris Doctor degree and PhD in public policy at the University of California, Berkeley. Before working for Duane, Lyman, and Seltzer, Cheit clerked for Justice Hans Linde of the Oregon Supreme Court. He joined the faculty at Brown in 1987.

For fifteen years, Cheit was a member of the Rhode Island Ethics Commission, including eight years as chairman.

References

Living people
Brown University faculty
Williams College alumni
UC Berkeley School of Law alumni
Goldman School of Public Policy alumni
American social sciences writers
California lawyers
Year of birth missing (living people)